Sarsawa Assembly constituency was one of the 403 constituencies of the Uttar Pradesh Legislative Assembly, India. It was a part of the Saharanpur district and one of five assembly constituencies in the Saharanpur (Lok Sabha constituency).

Sarsawa Assembly constituency was into existence till 2008 as a result of the "Delimitation of Parliamentary and Assembly Constituencies Order, 2008" and demolished in 2012 and became part of Nakur, and some part included in Behat.

Member of the Legislative Assembly

Election results

15th Vidhan Sabha: 2007 General Elections.

14th Vidhan Sabha: 2002 General Elections.

13th Vidhan Sabha: 1996 General Elections.

12th Vidhan Sabha: 1993 General Elections.

11th Vidhan Sabha: 1991 General Elections.

10th Vidhan Sabha: 1989 General Elections.

09th Vidhan Sabha: 1985 General Elections.

08th Vidhan Sabha: 1980 General Elections.

07th Vidhan Sabha: 1977 General Elections.

06th Vidhan Sabha: 1974 General Elections.

05th Vidhan Sabha: 1969 General Elections.

04th Vidhan Sabha: 1967 General Elections.

03rd Vidhan Sabha: 1962 General Elections.

See also

Behat
Government of Uttar Pradesh
List of Vidhan Sabha constituencies of Uttar Pradesh
Uttar Pradesh
Uttar Pradesh Legislative Assembly

Notes

 Behat Assembly constituency came into existence in 2008. Prior to 2008, this constituency was served / represented by Sarsawa (Assembly constituency) which now ceases to exist.

References 

Former assembly constituencies of Uttar Pradesh
Politics of Saharanpur district
Constituencies established in 2008
2008 establishments in Uttar Pradesh